Imsu was according to the Assyrian King List (AKL) the 7th Assyrian monarch, ruling in Assyria's early period, though he is not attested in any known contemporary artefacts. He is listed among the "seventeen kings who lived in tents" within the Mesopotamian Chronicles. Imsu is in the lists preceded by Mandaru, and succeeded by Harsu.

See also

 Timeline of the Assyrian Empire
 Early Period of Assyria
 List of Assyrian kings
 Assyrian continuity
 Assyrian people
 Assyria

References

24th-century BC Assyrian kings